Naftal Lungameni Sakaria is a Namibian Police officer. Sakaria started his policing career on May 1, 1996, and received his basic training at the Oudtshoorn Police Training College in South Africa. Prior to serving in the current position, he served as the head of the Special Reserve Force, and appointed as police regional commander for Oshana Region, Namibia. When he was promoted to the Oshana regional commander in August 2022, he commenced his duties with his first crime-prevention operation, called "Operation Lungameni", which is loosely translated as 'to be wise', and the operation was launched at Ondangwa.

Previously, he was deployed under the United Nations Mission in South Sudan in 2016 until 2017, January 2018 and later returned April 2019. He also worked as a field officer in Juba as a team leader for the community policing and gender, children and vulnerable person protection unit.

Education 
His academic qualifications ranges from a National Diploma in Policing from the University of Pretoria, a bachelor's degree in Criminal Justice from the Namibia University of Science and Technology and a Bachelor's in Policing Practice (Honours) from the Southern Business School.

References

Living people
Namibian police officers
People from Oshana Region
Oshiwambo words and phrases
University of Pretoria alumni
Namibia University of Science and Technology alumni
Year of birth missing (living people)